International men's cricket was first played in England in 1868 by the touring Australian Aboriginal cricket team, although it would not be until 1878 that the first tour by a team termed as representative was made by the touring Australians. The first Test match to be played in England came two years later in 1880 between England and Australia at The Oval. The same two sides played in the first One Day International to be held in England at Old Trafford during Australia's 1972 tour. In 2005, the Rose Bowl hosted the first Twenty20 International to be played in England during Australia's 2005 tour.

Men's international grounds

Active venues
Below is a complete list of grounds used for men's international cricket in England and Wales, listed in order of first use.

Former venues
Below is a complete list of grounds used for men's international cricket in England and Wales, listed in order of first use.

Notes

References

Cricket grounds in England
Cricket grounds in Wales
Lists of cricket grounds